Mian Qaleh (also Romanized as Mīān Qal‘eh) is a village in Ghaleh Rural District, in the Zagros District of Chardavol County, Ilam Province, Iran. At the 2006 census, its population was 517, in 106 families. The village is populated by Kurds.

References 

Populated places in Chardavol County
Kurdish settlements in Ilam Province